Shane Parker may refer to:

Shane Parker (footballer), Australian rules footballer
Shane A. Parker, museum curator
Shane Parker (speedway rider), motorcycle speedway rider
Shane Parker (priest), Anglican bishop of Ottawa